Unfair may refer to:
 Double Taz and Double LeBron James in multiverses fair; unfairness or injustice
 Unfair (drama), Japanese television series
 Unfair: The Movie
 Unfair (song), a song by South Korean boy group EXO